Solidago rugosa, commonly called the wrinkleleaf goldenrod or rough-stemmed goldenrod, is a species of flowering plant in the family Asteraceae. It is native to North America, where it is widespread across eastern and central Canada (from Newfoundland to Ontario) and the eastern and central United States (Maine west as far as Wisconsin and Iowa, south to Florida and Texas). It is usually found in wet to mesic habitats.

Description
Its leaves are primarily cauline. One plant can produce as many as 50 stems, each with 50–1500 yellow flower heads. It flowers in late summer through fall. It can be distinguished from the similar-looking Solidago ulmifolia by the presence of creeping rhizomes, and by its more abrupt leaf bases.

Taxonomy
Solidago rugosa is a variable plant throughout its range. Five varieties are currently recognized, although their relationships are complex and poorly understood. The varieties are:
Solidago rugosa var. aspera (Aiton) Fernald - common throughout the east
Solidago rugosa var. celtidifolia (Small) Fernald - coastal plain from Texas to Virginia
Solidago rugosa var. cronquistiana Semple - high elevations in Georgia, Tennessee, North Carolina
Solidago rugosa var. rugosa - common, generally more northern and Appalachian
Solidago rugosa var. sphagnophila C. Graves - cedar swamps from Nova Scotia to coastal Virginia

Conservation
Solidago rugosa is common throughout most of its range, and is not tracked at the species level in any state or province it is native to. However, in Connecticut the variety sphagnophila is listed as a special concern and believed to be extirpated from the state.

Cultivation
Solidago rugosa is grown as an ornamental garden plant. The cultivar ‘Fireworks’ has gained the Royal Horticultural Society’s Award of Garden Merit.

Native American ethnobotany
The Iroquois use the whole plant for biliousness and as liver medicine, and take a decoction of flowers and leaves for dizziness, weakness or sunstroke.

References

External links

rugosa
Plants described in 1768
Plants used in traditional Native American medicine
Flora of Eastern Canada
Flora of the Northeastern United States
Flora of the Southeastern United States
Flora of the North-Central United States
Taxa named by Philip Miller
Flora without expected TNC conservation status